Lucinda may refer to:

 Lucinda (given name), people with the given name Lucinda
 Lucinda, Queensland, a town in Australia
 Lucinda (steam yacht), a steam yacht of the Queensland Government
 Lucinda (novel), a novel by P. D. Manvill first published in 1807
 Lucinda, a fictional fairy character in Ella Enchanted
 "Lucinda", a song by Tom Waits from the album Orphans: Brawlers, Bawlers & Bastards